That Uncertain Feeling is a 1941 American comedy film directed by Ernst Lubitsch and starring Merle Oberon, Melvyn Douglas and Burgess Meredith. The film is about the bored wife of an insurance salesman who meets an eccentric pianist and seeks a divorce. The screenplay by Walter Reisch and Donald Ogden Stewart was based on the 1880 French play Divorçons by Victorien Sardou and Émile de Najac.

Plot

At the suggestion of one of her friends, Jill Baker visits psychoanalyst Dr. Vengard for her intermittent hiccups, which appear when she gets nervous or irritated. He soon has her questioning her previously happy marriage to her business executive husband Larry.

In Vengard's waiting room one day, Jill meets a very odd and individualistic pianist, Alexander Sebastian. He considers himself the best in the world when playing for a single listener, but has trouble performing in front of a large audience. She eventually invites him to an important dinner for Larry's prospective insurance buyers. When Larry realizes that Jill is infatuated with Sebastian, he gives her a friendly divorce, in which Larry is represented by a lawyer named Jones whose secretary is Sally Aikens.

Jill gets engaged to Sebastian, but after she learns that Larry is seeing an attractive woman, she realizes that she still loves her ex-husband. When she visits his apartment to reconcile with him, he goes into the next room and talks loudly, pretending Sally Aikens is in the room and that she is his girlfriend. His deception is revealed when Sally enters the apartment while he is in the next room breaking a dinner date with the distraught "Sally" (her supposed cries of anguish voiced by Larry). Jill and Larry get back together, and her hiccups vanish forever.

Cast
 Merle Oberon as Jill Baker
 Melvyn Douglas as Larry Baker
 Burgess Meredith as Alexander Sebastian
 Alan Mowbray as Dr. Vengard
 Olive Blakeney as Margie Stallings, Jill's friend
 Harry Davenport as Jones, Larry's lawyer
 Sig Ruman as Mr. Kafka, Larry's prospective client
 Eve Arden as Sally Aikens
 Richard Carle as The Butler
 Rolfe Sedan as Art Dealer (uncredited)

Reception
The film was a failure at the box office.

Award and honors
Werner R. Heymann was nominated for an Oscar for Best Music, Scoring of a Dramatic Picture.

See also
 Let's Get a Divorce (1918)
 Kiss Me Again (1925)

References

External links

 
 
 
 
 

1941 films
1941 romantic comedy films
1940s screwball comedy films
American romantic comedy films
American screwball comedy films
American black-and-white films
Comedy of remarriage films
1940s English-language films
American films based on plays
Films based on works by Victorien Sardou
Films directed by Ernst Lubitsch
Films set in New York City
United Artists films
Films with screenplays by Donald Ogden Stewart
Articles containing video clips
Films produced by Sol Lesser
1940s American films